Romeu Freitas Torres (born 7 August 1986 in Santo Tirso, Porto District) is a Portuguese professional footballer who plays as a forward.

References

External links

1986 births
Living people
People from Santo Tirso
Portuguese footballers
Portuguese expatriate footballers
Association football forwards
Primeira Liga players
Liga Portugal 2 players
Segunda Divisão players
F.C. Paços de Ferreira players
C.D. Aves players
F.C. Arouca players
F.C. Penafiel players
C.D. Trofense players
Al-Nahda Club (Oman) players
Al Hala SC players
Cypriot First Division players
Cypriot Second Division players
Olympiakos Nicosia players
FC Progrès Niederkorn players
Aris Limassol FC players
Alki Oroklini players
Expatriate footballers in Bahrain
Expatriate footballers in Oman
Expatriate footballers in Cyprus
Expatriate footballers in Luxembourg
Portuguese expatriate sportspeople in Cyprus
Sportspeople from Porto District